David Paul Grove (born December 10, 1958) is a Canadian actor.

Career
Grove has voiced Jonny 2x4 in Ed, Edd n Eddy and played one of the Dwarfs, Doc, in Once Upon a Time. He has appeared in several Christmas films like Elf and The Santa Clause. Grove sometimes goes by his nickname "Buck", as is shown in several of the credits of his film and television appearances.

Filmography

Film

Television

Video games

References

External links
 

1958 births
Canadian male film actors
Canadian male television actors
Canadian male voice actors
Living people
Male actors from Calgary
20th-century Canadian male actors
21st-century Canadian male actors